Danya Ruttenberg (born February 6, 1975) is an American rabbi, editor, and author.

Biography
Her family attended a Reform synagogue in Chicago, and she described herself as having been atheist around that time. Ruttenberg later became a part of the Conservative movement within Judaism.

When she was in college her mother died of breast cancer, and Ruttenberg reconsidered religion, practiced Jewish mourning rituals, which she said allowed her to "make friends with Judaism, to be open to it"; in 2008 she published a memoir of her spiritual awakening titled Surprised by God: How I Learned To Stop Worrying and Love Religion (Beacon Press). This memoir was a finalist for the Sami Rohr Prize for Jewish Literature.

She was ordained in 2008 by the Ziegler School of Rabbinic Studies in Los Angeles.

In 2016, she published Nurture the Wow: Finding Spirituality in the Frustration, Boredom, Tears, Poop, Desperation, Wonder, and Radical Amazement of Parenting with Flatiron Books, which was named a National Jewish Book Award finalist and a PJ Library Parents' Choice selection.

Ruttenberg is the editor of the 2001 anthology Yentl's Revenge: The Next Wave of Jewish Feminism and the 2009 anthology The Passionate Torah: Sex and Judaism. She is also a contributing editor to Lilith and Women in Judaism. She and Rabbi Elliot Dorff are co-editors of three books for the Jewish Publication Society’s Jewish Choices/Jewish Voices series: "Sex and Intimacy", "War and National Security", and "Social Justice".
She served as the Senior Jewish Educator at Tufts University Hillel, and subsequently Campus Rabbi at Northwestern Hillel and Director of Education for the campus dialogue program Ask Big Questions.  She served as Rabbi in Residence for Avodah.

In 2022, Ruttenberg published On Repentance and Repair: Making Amends in an Unapologetic World.

Political views 
In regards to abortion laws, Danya Ruttenberg stand on the side to preserve rights to abortion (Pro-Abortion). Danya Ruttenberg stated:"I’m a rabbi and a scholar in residence at the National Council of Jewish Women, which fights to preserve the right to abortion and expand access to the procedure. Our organization’s Rabbis for Repro network includes more than 1,800 Jewish clergy of every denomination committed to supporting abortion access for all. My activism is grounded both in Jewish law and in my tradition’s understanding of our profound commitments to one another."She also is a strong supporter of women's rights. Danya Ruttenberg stated:"As a Jew, I am commanded by the Torah to fight for a just society—one with systems and structures that protect and empower everyone, especially those who are most marginalized and vulnerable. My tradition teaches that we serve God when we care for one another, and this principle animates all of my work at the National Council of Jewish Women, where we strive to improve the lives and rights of women, children, and families through grassroots education and advocacy work—including a 1,000-strong network of Rabbis for Repro—and in all of my writing and public scholarship."

Awards and honors
Ruttenberg was named one of The Jewish Week "36 Under 36" in 2010 (36 most influential leaders under age 36), and the same year was named one of the top 50 most influential women rabbis by The Jewish Daily Forward.

In January 2023, her book On Repentance and Repair won the Contemporary Jewish Life and Practice Award at the 72nd National Jewish Book Awards.

References 

American Conservative rabbis
Conservative women rabbis
Living people
1975 births
Jewish ethicists
Conservative Jewish feminists
American feminists
21st-century American Jews